Hobbins is a surname. Notable people with the surname include:

Barry Hobbins (born 1951), American politician
Daniel Hobbins, American historian
Graham Hobbins (born 1946), English cricketer
Imelda Hobbins, Irish camogie player
Jim Hobbins (born 1964), American football player
Syd Hobbins (1916–1984), English footballer
William T. Hobbins (born 1946), United States Air Force general